The second incarnation of CBS Corporation (the first being a short-lived rename of the Westinghouse Electric Corporation) was an American multinational media conglomerate with interests primarily in commercial broadcasting, publishing, and television production. It was one of the two companies formed from the December 31, 2005 spin-off of the Viacom assets of the original Viacom, as founded by Ralph Baruch in 1952 as CBS Television Film Sales. It was one of two companies which succeeded the original incarnation of Viacom, alongside the second incarnation of Viacom; both were controlled by National Amusements, a theater company controlled by billionaire Sumner Redstone. The spin-off was structured so that CBS Corporation would be the legal successor to the first Viacom, with the second Viacom being an entirely separated company.

CBS Corporation comprised the over-the-air television (CBS and The CW) broadcasting, television production and distribution, publishing, pay-cable, and recording assets that were previously owned by the first Viacom. It was the world's eighth largest entertainment company in terms of revenue and headquartered at the CBS Building in Midtown Manhattan, New York City.

The second merger between CBS Corporation and Viacom, creating the combined company ViacomCBS (now Paramount Global), was completed on December 4, 2019.

Background 
The first incarnation of Viacom was created in 1952 as the television syndication division of CBS and was spun off in 1971. However, in 1999, Viacom acquired its former parent, by this time also named CBS Corporation, formerly Westinghouse Electric. The prior CBS Corporation also owned CMT and The Nashville Network, which remained Viacom properties after the 2005 split, but the prior CBS did not own UPN, Showtime, Paramount Television, Paramount Parks, or Simon & Schuster.

History

Early history 
In March 2005, Viacom contemplated splitting the company into two publicly traded companies, amid issues of the stock price stagnating (although it was alleged that another main force behind the split was the Super Bowl XXXVIII halftime show controversy, which led to MTV not being allowed to produce any more halftime shows, they had also produced the show for Super Bowl XXXV, the first Super Bowl CBS aired since regaining NFL rights and becoming MTV's corporate sibling).

On June 14, 2005, the Viacom board of directors approved the split of the company into two firms. The CBS Corporation name would be revived for one of the companies, to be headed by longtime television executive (and Viacom co-president) Les Moonves, and would include the namesake television network CBS, UPN, Infinity Broadcasting Corporation, Viacom Outdoor, Showtime Networks, and Paramount Television.

The split was structured such that the second Viacom was spun off from the first Viacom, which was renamed CBS Corporation. In a sense, this was a repeat of the 1971 spinoff. However, in this case, CBS retained virtually all of the prior firm's broadcast television assets, including its various syndication companies.

With the split, the two companies began trading on the New York Stock Exchange on January 3, 2006. Investors anticipated Viacom benefiting from the split, but instead, it dropped approximately 20 percent, while CBS Corporation rose 9 percent, that same year, Paramount Parks became a wholly-owned theme park unit of CBS Corporation.

Subsequent developments 
In January 2006, CBS and DIC Entertainment signed a multi-year deal in which DIC bought the Saturday morning airtime as "CBS's Saturday Morning Secret Slumber Party". In June 2006, DiC added a production partner AOL's KOL. Thus, this block would be called "KOL's Saturday Morning Secret Slumber Party on CBS".

On January 24, 2006, CBS Corporation and Warner Bros. created a new broadcast network, The CW. The network officially debuted on September 18, 2006. The network formally debuted on September 20 with the 2-hour premiere of America's Next Top Model. The network is the result of a merger of The WB (a Warner Bros. holding) and UPN (a CBS Corporation holding). CBS Corporation and Time Warner each own 50% of the network. Tribune Broadcasting (which previously owned a 25% stake on The WB) and CBS Corporation contributed its stations as new network affiliates.

On May 23, 2006, CBS Corporation sold Paramount Parks to the Cedar Fair Entertainment Company. With this acquisition, Cedar Fair became the third-largest theme park operator. On June 30, 2006, Cedar Fair completed its acquisition of Paramount Parks from CBS Corporation in a cash transaction valued at US$1.24 billion. The transaction included a 10-year license that allowed Cedar Fair to use the Paramount name in the parks through the 2017 season.

On February 7, 2007, CBS sold seven stations in Providence, Rhode Island, Austin, Texas, Salt Lake City and West Palm Beach, Florida to Cerberus Capital Management for US$185 million. It sold another station, WFRV-TV in Green Bay, Wisconsin, and its satellite station, WJMN-TV in Escanaba, Michigan, to Liberty Media on February 13, 2007. News reports estimate the deal at about US$234 million. CBS is swapping the stations and US$170 million in cash for 7.59 million shares of CBS common stock held by Liberty Media.

On February 26, 2007, CBS began investing in Electric Sheep, which is a virtual world content developer. CBS hired Electric Sheep to develop some projects, including the creation of "The L-Word in Second Life". CBS also shot a commercial within the virtual world Second Life to promote its show Two and a Half Men. Another project that Electric Sheep was working on for CBS was a Star Trek-themed area in Second Life. By investing in Electric Sheep, CBS hoped to expand its activity "beyond the living room". On March 20, CBS/CSTV had acquired MaxPreps, an online high school sports network. On April 12, CBS Corporation created the CBS Interactive Audience Network. On May 30, 2007, CBS Interactive bought Last.fm for £140 million.

On May 15, 2008, CBS Interactive agreed to buy CNET Networks for $1.8 billion, with the deal due to close in the third quarter of 2008. On July 2 CBS acquired CNET and put it under CBS Interactive.

On February 14, 2013, CBS acquired a minority stake in AXS TV in exchange for programming and marketing. On March 26, CBS and Lionsgate entered a 50/50 joint venture to operate the TV Guide Network (TVGN) and TVGuide.com. On May 31, CBS bought the remaining half of TV Guide Digital from Lionsgate. The latter still retained its share of TVGN (later rebranded as Pop) until it was acquired by CBS on March 12, 2019. On July 16, CBS agreed to sell CBS Outdoor International to Platinum Equity for about $225M. The CBS Outdoor division began trading as a separate company on the NYSE under "CBSO" on March 28, 2014. CBS Outdoor would be fully divested from CBS by July into an independent real estate investment trust, renamed as Outfront Media.

On November 17, 2017, CBS Corporation sold CBS Radio to Entercom, making that company the second-largest owner of radio stations in the United States.
In the same year, CBS purchased Australian broadcaster Network 10. The network was previously in voluntary administration.

As of November 2018, CBS Corporation ranked 197th on the Fortune 500 list of the largest United States corporations by revenue. CBS Corp. sold Television City to Los Angeles real estate investment company Hackman Capital Partners for $750 million in a deal finalized in mid-December 2018. The deal gives the buyer the right to use the Television City name. Programs produced at Television City will continue to be based there as will CBS' international unit headquarters.

Re-merger deal with Viacom 

On September 29, 2016, National Amusements sent a letter to the company and Viacom, encouraging the two companies to merge back into one company. On December 12, the deal was called off.

On January 12, 2018, CNBC reported that Viacom had re-entered talks to merge back into CBS Corporation, after AT&T's purchase of Time Warner was planned and Disney's plan to acquire bulk of 21st Century Fox assets and the heavy competition from companies such as Netflix and Amazon. Shortly afterward, it was reported that the combined company could be a suitor for acquiring the film studio Lionsgate (which handled US distribution and global sales for CBS Films). A re-merger could benefit CBS's streaming service CBS All Access, as it could potentially have access to content from core Viacom brands such as Comedy Central, MTV, and Nickelodeon, as well as the Paramount Pictures library. Viacom's international presence could also benefit distribution.

On March 30, 2018, CBS made an all-stock offer slightly below Viacom's market value and insisting that its existing leadership, including long-time chairman and CEO Les Moonves, oversee the re-combined company. Viacom rejected the offer as being too low, requesting an increase by $2.8 billion, and requesting that Bob Bakish be maintained as president and COO under Moonves. It was reported these conflicts had resulted from Shari Redstone seeking more control over CBS and its leadership.

Eventually, on May 14, 2018, CBS Corporation sued National Amusements and accused Shari Redstone of abusing her voting power and forcing a merger that was not supported by it or Viacom. CBS also accused Redstone of discouraging Verizon Communications from acquiring it, which could have been beneficial to its shareholders.

On May 23, 2018, Les Moonves stated that he considered the Viacom channels to be an "albatross," and while he favored more content for CBS All Access, he believed that there were better deals for CBS than the Viacom deal, such as Metro-Goldwyn-Mayer (MGM), Lionsgate or Sony Pictures. Moonves also considered Bakish a threat as he never wanted an ally of Shari Redstone as a board member of the combined company. Following Moonves' resignation due to sexual harassment allegations, National Amusements agreed in September 2018 to defer any proposal of a CBS-Viacom merger for at least two years after the date of the settlement.

On May 30, 2019, CNBC reported that CBS Corporation and Viacom would explore merger discussions in mid-June 2019. The company's board of directors was revamped with people who are open to a merger and the talks were made possible with the resignation of Moonves, who opposed all attempts for a Viacom merger. The talks had started following rumors of CBS acquiring Starz from Lionsgate. Reports said that CBS and Viacom reportedly set August 8 as an informal deadline for reaching an agreement to recombine the two media companies. As part of the re-merger deal, CBS acquired Viacom for up to $15.4 billion.

On August 13, 2019, CBS and Viacom agreed to merge into a new entity known as ViacomCBS, with Viacom CEO Bob Bakish as president and CEO of the new company and CBS CEO Ianniello as chairman and CEO of CBS and oversee CBS-branded assets. Shari Redstone will also serve as chairwoman of ViacomCBS. On October 29, 2019, National Amusements approved the re-merger deal, to be completed by early December 2019, with the recombined company trading on Nasdaq under the symbol "VIAC" and "VIACA" after CBS delist its shares on the NYSE. On December 4, the deal was completed, with the merger structured such that CBS Corporation absorbed Viacom and changed its name to ViacomCBS.

Corporate governance
The board of directors of CBS Corporation included:
Candace K. Beinecke
Barbara M. Byrne
Gary L. Countryman
Brian Goldner
Linda M. Griego
Robert N. Klieger
Martha L. Minow
Shari Redstone (vice-chair)
Sumner Redstone (chairman emeritus)
Susan Schuman
Frederick O. Terrell
Strauss Zelnick (interim chairman)

Philanthropy
In September 2018, CBS, together with former CEO Moonves, donated $20 million to groups supporting the #MeToo movement.

See also 

 Westinghouse Electric Corporation, an old instance of the company, purchased by the old Viacom in 1999.
 CBS Television Stations, the holding company that assumes operation of CBS Corp.'s television stations.
 Concentration of media ownership and Media conglomerate
 MTV Networks/BET Networks, part of the new Paramount Global corporation.

Notes

References

External links 
 Official website (archived, 1 Dec 2018)

Predecessors of Paramount Global
2005 establishments in New York City
2019 disestablishments in New York (state)
American companies established in 2005
American companies disestablished in 2019
Defunct broadcasting companies of the United States
Companies based in Manhattan
Companies formerly listed on the New York Stock Exchange
Conglomerate companies established in 2005
Conglomerate companies disestablished in 2019
Defunct mass media companies of the United States
Entertainment companies based in New York City
Entertainment companies established in 2005
Entertainment companies disestablished in 2019
Entertainment companies of the United States
Mass media companies established in 2005
Mass media companies disestablished in 2019
Mass media companies of the United States
Mass media companies based in New York City
Defunct companies based in New York City
2019 mergers and acquisitions